The Church of Saint Michael (Spanish: Iglesia de San Miguel) is a church in Jerez de la Frontera, Spain. It was declared Bien de Interés Cultural in 1931.

History 

The Church of Saint Michael started its life in the end of the  15th century. A plaque at the door of its Gothic facade is dated 1484. It is believed that the church was commissioned by the Catholic Monarchs when they visited the city in 1484. Previously, the area was served by an old hermitage. Its construction, however, would last several centuries resulting in an excellent cathedral-like set where latest gothic elements and other ones typical from beginning and full renaissance and baroque.

Description 

The church has a rectangular floor divided into three naves.  The central nave has a higher ceiling and between each nave are pilasters crafted in a flowery gothic style. It is considered one of the best temples in the city of Jerez.

See also 
 List of Bien de Interés Cultural in the Province of Cádiz
 History of early modern period domes

References

External links 

 360º view

Bien de Interés Cultural landmarks in the Province of Cádiz
Churches in Jerez de la Frontera